Ring of Fear may refer to:

Ring of Fear (film), a 1954 murder mystery starring Mickey Spillane and Clyde Beatty
"Ring of Fear" (A Dangerous Assignment), an episode of TV show Police Squad! 
Ring of Fear, a 1971 Anne McCaffrey romance novel